Davide Scazzieri (born 8 August 1972 in Bologna) is an Italian para table tennis player who now competes in sports category 4.

He is disabled due to an accident.

See also
Italy at the 2012 Summer Paralympics

References

External links
 
 Athlete profile at Comitato Italiano Paralimpico 

1972 births
Living people
Sportspeople from Bologna
Paralympic table tennis players of Italy
Table tennis players at the 2012 Summer Paralympics
Italian male table tennis players